In video games, a random map is a map generated randomly by the computer, usually in strategy games. Random maps are often the core of single and multiplayer gameplay, aside from story based campaigns that are often shipped with the game. Each new game presents an unknown map, providing a new experience to the player, and an even playing field in multiplayer gaming. Random maps typically have a certain theme - for example a naval random map with many small islands, or a 'gold rush' map with a large amount of gold in the center of the map. The type of random map may also influence the game's artificial intelligence, with the AI employing different strategies optimized for each random map.

Methods for generating such maps vary depending upon the topography of the game itself. A game which requires natural landscapes may use fractal subdivision to create convincing terrain, whereas a game set inside a structure such as a dungeon may use two-dimensional maze algorithms. Some games allow the players to make their own random map scripts (RMS), a form of game modification. Random map scripts provide instructions for generating the map, such as terrain types, resource locations, and many other factors. Random maps can also be used by scenario designer to unlock previously unavailable units. For example in Age of Empires II, designers have used RMS to unlock new terrains and units. The unit-terrain combination of fish on shoreless water is one such application of this technique. Another example is Empire Earth, where an unused dark red coloured cliff can be unlocked through a custom random map script.

See also 
 Procedural generation

Sources 
 
 

Video game gameplay